The Willow Creek AVA is an American Viticultural Area located in the Humboldt and Trinity counties of northern California, near the town of Willow Creek.

From the Beginning

Willow Creek has historically had a reputation for being a great growing region. There have been numerous agriculturally related private and commercial enterprises up and 
down the river. The most successful of these have been pot and peach orchards with the recent addition of small individual farmsteads producing and marketing fruits and 
vegetables at farmers markets and small roadside stands. Wine grapes while undoubtedly grown for personal table wine production really were not a significant part of this small river town economy until the early nineteen hundreds.

Enter the Gambi Family

The Gambis were immigrants coming to the United States in the early Twentieth Century from the Italian region of Tuscany. As the stories go, this industrious farm family first landed on our east coast and worked their way across the nation arriving at the Willow Creek Valley. Upon seeing Willow Creek they immediately fell in love with this small agricultural valley with its abundant water, sloping hillsides, and long days filled with sunshine. This valley reminded them of the Tuscan countryside and to them they were back home.
Thus begins long, industrious family enterprises that includes farms, restaurants, cottages, and, most significant for the history of the Willow Creek AVA, a commercial winery. There is little written record of the actual winery operation, so most of what is written here about the Gambi winery is from interviews and anecdotal information. What is 
known is the family bonded the first Willow Creek winery and produced and sold table wines before prohibition, maybe during prohibition, and after its repeal right up till the nineteen seventies when the last of the Gambi family sold out and left the area. The 
wines most likely were only marketed locally through direct to consumer sales, the 
family restaurant, and local friends.
There are some very interesting structures and artifacts that still chronicle the Gambi 
wine era. Pictured below in front of the Winnett Vineyards winery is a wine press and redwood fermentation tank removed from the Gambi winery and given to the Wirmetts by individuals whom had purchased some of the old Gambi property. Mark and Londa Rowly, owners of Coho Cottages and more recently China Creek Cabins, the old Gambi Resort, have discovered a wine cellar below the main building. There is also reported to exist a wine cave and oak casks used by the Gambis for wine storage. Even more 
interesting are the remnants of the old vineyards. Some of the old grape vines that would now be approaching 100 years old still live on various lots subdivided from the original vineyard. Most likely they are red Italian varieties with Sangiovese being one of them as that grape is the great wine grape of the Tuscan region.
Although there is no known critic as to the quality of the Gambi wine, local consumers speak of it as being an intense red wine high in alcohol and filled with stone fruit flavors. This commentary on the wine's character would seem to be consistent with the cultural background of the Gambis and certainly similar to the commercial wines being produced in the Willow Creek AVA today.
During this early period of Willow Creek wine grape production there was an additional grower along the river just down river from town. Apparently the property was owned by the Gardner family and Ms. Gardner experimented with the propagation of multiple 
varieties of wine grapes. While no wine was commercially produced by the Gardner 
family, several hobby wineries and at least two commercial wineries on the coast 
produced wine from these grapes.

The vineyard manager/caretaker for the property was a gentleman by the name of David Kenney. He and his family lived on the property, tended the vines, harvested and sold grapes, and made a little wine for their own consumption. David Kenney, would later help Winnett Vineyards establish their vineyard, initially with cuttings from the Gardner ranch, and later with grafted root stock from the Sonoma region. The Gardner property was later purchased by Lane Devries and the vineyards were expanded. Currently the vineyard is managed by Wil Franklin who produces wine under the Sun Valley label.

Willow Creek Wine Production Expands

About the time the Gambi family vineyards and winery was coming to a halt, two school teachers from the coast planted their own vineyards in Willow Creek, Ed Oliviera, a 
teacher in the Arcata schools, later to become an administrator for the district, and Dean Williams, teacher/administrator in the McKinleyville district. Ed's vineyard is a small planting of less than an acre close to the town of Salyer, and Dean planted his vineyard north of Willow Creek just off Patterson road. While both Dean and Ed have passed away their vines still produce fruit and their legacy certainly lives on.
The most significant contribution Ed and Dean made to the Willow Creek wine region was establishing the region as a designated American Viticulture Region (AVA). This distinction establishes the unique grape growing conditions of the region and allows wineries making wines from the grapes of the region to put "Willow Creek" as the 
designated growing region, as opposed to the more general designation of "California grapes", "North Coast grapes", or "Humboldt County grapes". This specificity provides the consumer with a much more complete understanding of where the grapes making up the wine they are consuming actually came from.

The Beginning of the Willow Creek AVA

The Willow Creek AVA was established in 1983 as one of the first in The United States. It is defined geographically by a section of the Trinity river valley under 1000 feet 
elevation and running from just up river from Salyer at Coon Creek, extending a short distance down river from the town of Willow Creek to Kirkham Creek, making it the most northern wine region in California! The Willow Creek AVA is also one of the 
smallest with only 6000 acres in its entire boundary.

The AVA distinction was given to Willow Creek based on its unique Micro Climate, soil structure, marine influence, and unique geographic features that affect wine grape 
growing. The term for the sum total of all factors influencing wine flavors and character is terroir. So when someone drinks a wine from grapes grown in the Willow Creek AVA they taste the terroir, the uniqueness of Willow Creek. For a more complete description of the Willow Creek AVA see the overview at the end of this article.

Willow Creek AVA in the 90´s

In the late 1990's a new generation of wine growers started arriving in the Willow Creek area. Serious about their craft and dedicated to establishing the Willow Creek AVA as a genuine commercial grape growing region, capable of producing wines that would rival the wines of the great wine regions of the world. What grape variety to plant, what type of trellising, whether to irrigate or dry farm are just a few of the important viticulture questions that are being addressed by the various vineyard owners. Recently the 
Humboldt Wine Makers Association located recording thermometers throughout the 
AVA and the data they are collecting substantiates the region as a moderately warm wine growing area. These formal and informal observations are resulting in an even better understanding of the Willow Creek AVA grape growing potential.

Physical Description

Willow Creek wine growing region is California's northern most designated American Viticulture Area (AVA). The region lies in a narrow valley formed by the Trinity River and although it is only 25 miles from the Pacific it still enjoys an abundance of sunlight and heat. The AVA was established in the 1970s by two area school teachers with small vineyards located in the Willow Creek Valley, Ed Oliviera and Dean Williams.

Geography: The region is very rugged and mountainous with the cold crystal clear
waters of the Trinity River rushing literally through the middle of the AVA. The valley floor is generally 400 — 500 feet above sea level surrounded by 4000 foot mountains. The AVA which runs from a point a few miles east of the town of Willow Creek and follows the river to a point a few miles southwest of town and is inclusive of the valley floor and surrounding slopes to an elevation of 1000 feet. The Trinity connects to the Klamath River several miles downstream from the AVA where the Klamath continues to the ocean. This long corridor to the cold ocean waters eventually leads to evening 
temperature drops of as much as 50 degrees.

Soil: Soils are typically very rocky with little clay content. Rocks, sand and a loose loam cover most of the land. Parent rock is ocean shale piled up from the continuous action of the Pacific plate diving under the North American plate and pushing marine deposits in front of the subduction zone. These soils are all well drained and vines must send their roots deep to avoid summer drought.
Climate: The growing season tends to be hot and dry with daytime temperatures mainly in the 90's reaching the 100's for week long stretches. Afternoon breezes coming up the rivers from the coast begin a dramatic daily cool down dropping temperatures as much as
50 degrees. Rainfall during the winter can be as much as 70 inches and temperatures do fall well below freezing.

Vineyards and Wineries: There are only 6 small commercial vineyards in the AVA
ranging in size from 2 acres to 20; Miles Garrett Vineyard, Dogwood Estates (under new ownership), Sentinel Vineyard, The Dragon Vineyard, Neukom Family Farms Vineyard and Sun Valley Vineyards. Of these 6 vineyards only 1 of them has a winery located in the Willow Creek AVA and that is Miles Garrett Vineyard. A diverse variety of wine grapes are being grown with varied success. Grape varieties grown include: Cabernet Sauvignon, Cabernet Franc, Malbec, Merlot, Pinot Noir, Sangiovese, and Zinfandel for the reds. The white wine grapes include Chardonnay, Sauvignon Blanc, Riesling, Semillon, and Chenin Blanc.

See also
 California wine
 Miles Garrett Wines

References

American Viticultural Areas
American Viticultural Areas of California
Geography of Humboldt County, California
Geography of Trinity County, California
1983 establishments in California